voestalpine Böhler Welding is a manufacturer of welding consumables (joint welding, maintenance, repair and overlay welding and brazing), welding equipment and accessories with headquarters in Düsseldorf. The company owns over 50 subsidiaries in more than 25 countries, 2,300 employees, customers in approximately 150 countries and more than 1,000 distribution partners.

The company is a business segment of the voestalpine AG Metal Engineering Division.

The company offers extensive technical consultation and individual solutions for industrial welding and soldering applications. It has three specialized and dedicated brands for joint welding, maintenance and cladding, and brazing and soldering.

Brands 

 Böhler Welding: 2.000 products for joint welding in all conventional arc welding processes, welding machines and accessories
 UTP Maintenance: Repair, wear and surface protection, welding accessories
 Fontargen Brazing: Brazing and soldering solutions

History 
1870 Founding of Böhler & CO in Vienna by the Böhler brothers Emil and Albert Böhler. 
1991 Böhler Welding becomes a separate division in the newly formed Böhler-Uddeholm and acquires UTP. 
1996 Böhler-Uddeholm and Thyssen merge their welding businesses into the joint venture Böhler Thyssen Welding (Böhler with UTP / Thyssen with Soudokay, Hilarius and Fontargen). *2003 Böhler-Uddeholm acquires 100% of joint venture Böhler Thyssen Welding. 
2004 Thyssen Welding Consumables (Thermanit, Phoenix, Union) renamed into brand T-PUT. 
2005 Böhler-Uddeholm acquires Avesta Welding. 
2007 voestalpine acquires Böhler-Uddeholm and division Böhler Thyssen Welding renamed Böhler Welding Group. 
2010 Böhler Welding Group switched from Böhler-Uddeholm to voestalpine Metal Engineering (formerly Railway Systems) as a separate division. 
2013 Integration into the voestalpine Group as part of the Metal Engineering Division. Renamed voestalpine Böhler Welding, and product brands simplified to: Böhler Welding, UTP Maintenance and Fontargen Brazing.
2019 product launch of Terra & Uranos welding equipment product lines.
2020 voestalpine Böhler Welding acquires a majority stake in Selco s.r.l., a long-standing Italian producer of welding machines.
2020 voestalpine Böhler Welding and Afrox Ltd. form Joint Venture for the manufacture of welding consumables

Products 
 Stick electrodes
 TIG rods
 Cored wires
 MIG/MAG solid wires
 SAW fluxes
Welding machines
Welding accessories
Equipment
Personal Protection
 Finishing Chemicals
 Brazing filler metals
 Brazing pastes, preforms, foils
 Thermal spraying powders, PTA powders

Alloys
 Unalloyed, low-alloyed
 Aluminum
 Nickel-base alloy
 Special alloy (Nickel, Copper, Cobalt)
 Stainless steel
 High-strength steel
 High/low temperature
 Corrosion resistant
 Heat resistant

References 

Austrian brands
Metal companies of Austria